Córdoba is a wetland, part of the Wetlands of Bogotá in Bogotá, Colombia. It is situated on the Bogotá savanna in the locality Suba between the Avenida Boyacá and Avenida Córdoba and the streets Calle 127 and Calle 116, close to the TransMilenio stations Av. Suba Calle 116 and namesake station Humedal Córdoba.

Flora and fauna

Flora 
Flora registered in the wetland are among others Alnus acuminata, Ficus soatensis, Senna multiglandulosa, Spirodela intermedia, Bidens laevis, Eichornia crassipes.

Birds 
Of the wetlands of Bogotá, Córdoba has the highest number of registered bird species with 96 of which 17 endemic.

Endemic species unique for this wetland are:

Gallery

See also 

Biodiversity of Colombia, Bogotá savanna, Thomas van der Hammen Natural Reserve
Wetlands of Bogotá

References

Bibliography

External links 

  Fundación Humedales de Bogotá
  Conozca los 15 humedales de Bogotá - El Tiempo

Wetlands of Bogotá